The International Conference on Environmental Systems, or ICES (known prior to 1990 as the Intersociety Conference on Environmental Systems), is an annual technical conference focusing on human spaceflight technology and space human factors. Session topics include: Environmental Control and Life Support Systems (ECLSS), thermal control, life sciences, extra-vehicular activity (EVA) systems (including space suit design and human-robot interaction), space architecture, and mission planning for exploration.

The conference has taken place annually since 1971.

History
The first ICES conference was held in San Francisco in 1971, after three years of work by members of Environmental Control and Life Support System specialist committees representing four different societies: the American Society of Mechanical Engineers (ASME), the Society of Automotive Engineers (SAE), the American Institute of Aeronautics and Astronautics (AIAA), and the Aerospace Medical Association (AsMA). It replaced three other meetings held each year as part of various society conference programs and since then it has been held every year.  In 1972, the American Institute of Chemical Engineers (AIChE) became the fifth and final co-sponsoring society for ICES.

Prior to 1990, ICES organization was US-only. In 1990 it became international, by merging the American conference with a similar conference held in Europe, and ICES started to be held abroad (for the first time in Germany in 1994). Since 2000, the ICES conference takes place four times out of five in the US and once in five years outside US (so far in 2000, 2005, 2010, 2016).

For its first 39 years, the main ICES organizer was the Society of Automotive Engineers; from 2010 through 2013, the American Institute of Aeronautics and Astronautics filled the role of main organizer, supported by American Institute of Chemical Engineers, American Society of Mechanical Engineers and ICES International Committee.  Starting in 2014, the conference became an independent entity that was organized by Texas Tech University. in 2014 and 2015.  In 2016, the conference became independent with its own website at http://www.ices.space whilst AIAA, AIChE, ASME, and the ICES International Committee continue organizing the conference sessions.

Papers presented at ICES are published every year in the conference proceedings, from 1971 to 2009 by SAE, then from 2010 to 2013 by AIAA. These papers are available and searchable online at the SAE and AIAA websites. They are now published by the ICES organization. Proceedings from the 2014-2019 conferences, hosted by Texas Tech University, are accessible from the ICES conference website.

Conference locations

The conference is located primarily in the United States, and was located exclusively on the west coast of the US for its first 19 years. Since 1994, the conference has taken place in Europe roughly once every five years.

Organization
The ICES conference is organized by the following committees:
 ICES Steering Committee
 AIAA Life Sciences and Systems Technical Committee
 AIChE Environmental Systems Committee
 ASME Crew Systems Technical Committee
 ICES Thermal and Environmental Control Systems Committee (TECS) (initially SAE Committee SC 9, Spacecraft Environmental Control and Life Support Systems, then SAE Space Environmental Systems Committee, then AIAA Space Environmental Systems Program Committee)
 ICES International Committee
Initially the conference was co-organized also by the AsMA Life Sciences and Biomedical Engineering Branch Executive Committee, now discontinued.

See also
Vision for Space Exploration

References

External links
Official website
Conference proceedings for 2014 and onward

Technology conferences
International conferences
Human spaceflight